Andrej Šimunec (born 2 March 1995) is a Croatian professional footballer who most recently played as a defender for Aves of the Portuguese Primeira Liga.

Career
Šimunec made his professional debut with his hometown club Osijek in a 1-0 Croatian First Football League win over HNK Rijeka on 6 April 2019. On 6 August 2019, signed with Aves for 3 seasons.

References

External links
 
 

1995 births
Living people
Sportspeople from Osijek
Association football defenders
Croatian footballers
Croatia youth international footballers
NK Osijek players
NK Inter Zaprešić players
C.D. Aves players
Croatian Football League players
Primeira Liga players
Croatian expatriate footballers
Expatriate footballers in Portugal
Croatian expatriate sportspeople in Portugal